Pholidoptera aptera, the alpine dark bush-cricket, is a species of cricket belonging to the subfamily Tettigoniinae. It is found in Eastern and Central Europe in the Alps and the Alpine foothills. In Switzerland, their presence limited to the eastern Alps, the Southern Alps and the Schaffhauser Randen. In Germany it occurs south of the line Bodensee, to southern Munich. It also occurs in Austria and Slovenia. It is found at altitudes from 260 to 2360 meters above sea level in densely forested clearings or clearcuts, high-altitude orchards, bracken slopes, rocky, dwarf shrub communities and areas densely populated with grasses and herbaceous plants. At high altitudes, warm southern slopes are preferred.

References

External links

Orthoptera of Europe
Insects described in 1793
Tettigoniinae